Carlos Jiménez (born ) is a Spanish male volleyball player. He is part of the Spain men's national volleyball team. On club level he plays for CPJM CETD Palencia.

References

External links
 profile at FIVB.org

1995 births
Living people
Spanish men's volleyball players
Place of birth missing (living people)
Competitors at the 2018 Mediterranean Games
Mediterranean Games silver medalists for Spain
Mediterranean Games medalists in volleyball